Isaac Cocks House is a historic home located at Cornwall in Orange County, New York. The main house was built about 1795 and is a two-story, five bay, center hall wood frame dwelling in the Federal style.  It features clapboard siding and a fieldstone basement.

It was listed on the National Register of Historic Places in 1996.

References

Houses on the National Register of Historic Places in New York (state)
Federal architecture in New York (state)
Houses completed in 1795
Houses in Orange County, New York
National Register of Historic Places in Orange County, New York